Kenny Prince Redondo (born 29 August 1994) is a German professional footballer who plays for 1. FC Kaiserslautern as a midfielder.

Career

Youth career
Redondo was with Rot-Weiss Oberföhring until 31 December 2007. At this point he transferred to SpVgg Unterhaching. He was with the youth teams until 2012–13 season.

SpVgg Unterhaching
Redondo made his professional debut in the 2013–14 season when he came into a 4–0 loss to Jahn Regensburg. The following season, he played for both the first team and reserve team. He scored two goals in 25 appearances in the 3. Liga, and for the reserve team, he made two appearances without scoring any goals in the Bayernliga.

Union Berlin
On 27 May 2015, Redondo signed for Union Berlin. He played in the first round of the German Cup against Viktoria Köln on 8 August 2015 and made his first 2. Bundesliga appearance on matchday six in a 3–0 win against Karlsruher SC. During the 2016–17 season, Redondo scored four goals in 33 matches played in the league. He also played in two German Cup matches. During the 2017–18 season, Redondo scored two goals in eight matches.

1. FC Kaiserslautern
Redondo joined 3. Liga club 1. FC Kaiserslautern on a free transfer on 5 October 2020, the last day of the 2020 summer transfer window.

Personal life
Redondo was born in Germany to an Ethiopian father, and a Spanish mother.

Career statistics

1.Includes German Cup.

References

Living people
1994 births
Footballers from Munich
Association football midfielders
German footballers
German people of Ethiopian descent
German sportspeople of African descent
Sportspeople of Ethiopian descent
German people of Spanish descent
2. Bundesliga players
3. Liga players
SpVgg Unterhaching players
SpVgg Unterhaching II players
1. FC Union Berlin players
SpVgg Greuther Fürth players
1. FC Kaiserslautern players